Rebecca Ellen Manuel  (born 13 June 1979) is an Australian diver and diving coach. She won the bronze medal with diving partner Loudy Tourky in the women's 10 m synchronized platform at the 2000 Summer Olympics in her home city of Sydney, New South Wales, Australia. She also placed 18th in the 3 m springboard competition and 11th in the 10 m platform at the 2000 Summer Olympics.

Manuel now coaches diving in Sydney.

References

External links 
 
 

1979 births
Living people
Australian female divers
Olympic divers of Australia
Olympic bronze medalists for Australia
Sportswomen from New South Wales
Divers at the 2000 Summer Olympics
Divers at the 1998 Commonwealth Games
Olympic medalists in diving
Divers from Sydney
Medalists at the 2000 Summer Olympics
Commonwealth Games competitors for Australia
20th-century Australian women
21st-century Australian women